Pattinson is an English surname, and may refer to

Bill Pattinson (rugby league, born 1945) (uncle of Bill Pattinson), rugby league footballer who played in the 1960s and 1970s
Bill Pattinson (rugby league, born 1954) (nephew of Bill Pattinson), rugby league footballer who played in the 1970s and 1980s
Charles Pattinson, British television producer
Christopher Pattinson (1885–1958), Canadian provincial politician from Alberta
Hugh Lee Pattinson (1796–1858), English industrial chemist
Lawrence Pattinson (1890–1955), Royal Air Force officer
Les Pattinson (born 1958), English bass guitarist
Lizzy Pattinson (born 1983), British singer
Michael Pattinson (born 1957), Australian film director
Paul Pattison, Academy Award winning makeup artist
Robert Pattinson (born 1986), British actor
brothers Darren Pattinson, English cricketer and James Pattinson, Australian cricketer 
brothers Samuel Pattinson (1870–1942) and Sir Robert Pattinson (1872–1954) were both English Liberal MPs

See also
Washington H. Soul Pattinson, Australian company
Soul Pattinson Telecommunications, Australian company
Pattison (disambiguation)
Patterson (surname)
Paterson (disambiguation)

English-language surnames
Patronymic surnames
Surnames from given names